Xystophora pulveratella is a moth of the family Gelechiidae. It is found from central and northern Europe to the Ural Mountains and southern Siberia.

The wingspan is 10–11 mm. Adults have brown forewings, with a buff tinge towards the apex. They are on wing from May to June.

The larvae have been found on Trifolium pratense, Lotus corniculatus, Vicia, Medicago and Lathyrus palustris. They feed from within spun leaves. The larvae can be found from August to September. The species overwinters in the cocoon.

References

Moths described in 1854
Xystophora
Moths of Europe